Tull is a surname. Notable people with the surname include:

Davis Tull (born 1991), American football player)
Edmund Tull (1870–1911), Hungarian artist
Fisher Tull (1934–1994), American musician
Jethro Tull (agriculturist) (1674–1740), English agricultural pioneer
Mustafa Wahbi et Tull (1897–1949), Jordanian poet
Patrick Tull (1941–2006), British actor
Thomas Tull (born 1970), American businessman and film producer
Walter Tull (1888–1918), British football player and soldier

Fictional characters:
Vernon Tull and Cora Tull, a fictional couple in the William Faulkner novel As I Lay Dying